Botalaote is a village in the  Central District of Botswana. The population in 2001 was 182. The population in 2011 was 192.

References

Villages in Botswana